VectorCell was a French video game developer founded in 2005. The company was owned by Paul Cuisset and Lexis Numérique. The company developed Amy for PlayStation 3 and Xbox 360. The company also planned to release Jesus Christ Super-Star on the iOS and Zeebo.

Previous releases include Mr Slime released under the Lexis Numérique label and published through SouthPeak Games in 2008.

In January 2010, VectorCell licensed Lightsprint SDK for Amy.

By the lack of success of the Flashback remake, the company suffered from the same fate as Delphine Software International and closed down on 18 November 2013 after bankruptcy and liquidation.

Games

References

External links 
 

French companies established in 2005
French companies disestablished in 2013
Defunct video game companies of France
Video game companies established in 2005
Video game companies disestablished in 2013
Video game development companies